Italy competed at the 1983 World Championships in Athletics in Helsinki, Finland from 7–14 August 1983.

Medalists

Finalists
Italy national athletics team ranked 8th (with 12 finalists) in the IAAF placing table. Score obtained by assigning eight points in the first place and so on to the eight finalists.

Results

Men (27)

Women (12)

References

External links
1ST IAAF WORLD CHAMPIONSHIPS IN ATHLETICS

Nations at the 1983 World Championships in Athletics
World Championships in Athletics
Italy at the World Championships in Athletics